In phonology, an allophone (from the Greek , , 'other' and , , 'voice, sound') is a set of multiple possible spoken soundsor phonesor signs used to pronounce a single phoneme in a particular language. For example, in English, the voiceless plosive  (as in stop ) and the aspirated form  (as in top ) are allophones for the phoneme , while these two are considered to be different phonemes in some languages such as Thai.

The specific allophone selected in a given situation is often predictable from the phonetic context, with such allophones being called positional variants, but some allophones occur in free variation. Replacing a sound by another allophone of the same phoneme usually does not change the meaning of a word, but the result may sound non-native or even unintelligible.

Native speakers of a given language perceive one phoneme in the language as a single distinctive sound and are "both unaware of and even shocked by" the allophone variations that are used to pronounce single phonemes.

History of concept
The term "allophone" was coined by Benjamin Lee Whorf circa 1929. In doing so, he is thought to have placed a cornerstone in consolidating early phoneme theory. The term was popularized by George L. Trager and Bernard Bloch in a 1941 paper on English phonology and went on to become part of standard usage within the American structuralist tradition.

Complementary and free-variant allophones and assimilation
Whenever a user's speech is vocalized for a given phoneme, it is slightly different from other utterances, even for the same speaker. That has led to some debate over how real and how universal phonemes really are (see phoneme for details). Only some of the variation is significant, by being detectable or perceivable, to speakers.

There are two types of allophones, based on whether a phoneme must be pronounced using a specific allophone in a specific situation or whether the speaker has the unconscious freedom to choose the allophone that is used.

If a specific allophone from a set of allophones that correspond to a phoneme must be selected in a given context, and using a different allophone for a phoneme would cause confusion or make the speaker sound non-native, the allophones are said to be complementary. The allophones then complement each other, and one of them is not used in a situation in which the usage of another is standard. For complementary allophones, each allophone is used in a specific phonetic context and may be involved in a phonological process.

In other cases, the speaker can freely select from free-variant allophones on personal habit or preference, but free-variant allophones are still selected in the specific context, not the other way around.

Another example of an allophone is assimilation, in which a phoneme is to sound more like another phoneme. One example of assimilation is consonant voicing and devoicing, in which voiceless consonants are voiced before and after voiced consonants, and voiced consonants are devoiced before and after voiceless consonants.

Allotone
An allotone is a tonic allophone, such as the neutral tone in Standard Mandarin.

Examples

English 

 
There are many allophonic processes in English: lack of plosion, nasal plosion, partial devoicing of sonorants, complete devoicing of sonorants, partial devoicing of obstruents, lengthening and shortening vowels, and retraction.

 Aspiration: In English, a voiceless plosive  is aspirated (has a strong explosion of breath) if it is at the beginning of the first or a stressed syllable in a word. English-speakers treat them as the same sound, but they are different: the first is aspirated and the second is unaspirated (plain). Many languages treat the two phones differently.
 Nasal plosion: In English, a plosive has nasal plosion if it is followed by a nasal, whether within a word or across a word boundary.
 Partial devoicing of sonorants: In English, sonorants are partially devoiced after a voiceless sound in the same syllable.
 Complete devoicing of sonorants: In English, a sonorant is completely devoiced after an aspirated plosive.
 Partial devoicing of obstruents: In English, a voiced obstruent is partially devoiced next to a pause or next to a voiceless sound within a word or across a word boundary.
 Retraction: In English,  are retracted before .

Because the choice among allophones is seldom under conscious control, few people realize their existence. English-speakers may be unaware of differences between a number of (dialect-dependent) allophones of the phoneme : 

 post-aspirated  as in top, 
 unaspirated  as in stop. 
 glottalized (or rather substituted by the glottal stop)  as in button, but many speakers preserve at least an unreleased coronal stop .

In addition, the following allophones of /t/ are found in (at least) some dialects of American(ised) English;
 flapped  as in American English water, 
 nasal(ized) flapped  as in American English winter. 
 unreleased  as in American English cat, but other dialects preserve the released , or substitute the glottal stop .

However, speakers may become aware of the differences iffor examplethey contrast the pronunciations of the following words:

Nitrate: aspirated  or retracted 

A flame that is held in front of the lips while those words are spoken flickers more for the aspirated nitrate than for the unaspirated night rate. The difference can also be felt by holding the hand in front of the lips.

One may notice the (dialect-dependent) allophones of English  such as the (palatal) alveolar "light"  of leaf  as opposed to the velar alveolar "dark"  in feel  found in the U.S. and Southern England.

These descriptions are more sequentially broken down in the next section.

Rules for English consonant allophones 

Peter Ladefoged, a renowned phonetician, clearly explains the consonant allophones of English in a precise list of statements to illustrate the language behavior. Some of these rules apply to all the consonants of English; the first item on the list deals with consonant length, items 2 through 18 apply to only selected groups of consonants, and the last item deals with the quality of a consonant. 
These descriptive rules are as follows:
 Consonants are longer when at the end of a phrase. This can be easily tested by recording a speaker saying a sound like “bib”, then comparing the forward and backward playback of the recording. One will find that the backward playback does not sound like the forward playback because the production of what is expected to be the same sound is not identical.
 Voiceless stops  are aspirated when they come at the beginning of a syllable, such as in words like "pip, test, kick" . You can compare this with voiceless stops that are not syllable initial like "stop" [stɑp].
 Voiced stops and affricates  in fact occur as voiceless at the beginning of a syllable unless immediately preceded by a voiced sound, in which the voiced sound carries over.
 Approximants (in English, these include ) are partially voiceless when they occur after syllable-initial  like in "play, twin, cue" .
 Voiceless stops  are not aspirated when following after a syllable initial fricative, such as in the words "spew, stew, skew."
 Voiceless stops and affricates  are longer than their voiced counterparts  when situated at the end of a syllable. Try comparing "cap" to "cab" or "back" to "bag".
 When a stop comes before another stop, the explosion of air only follows after the second stop, illustrated in words like "apt"  and "rubbed" .
 Many English accents produce a glottal stop in syllables that end with voiceless stops. Some examples include pronunciations of "tip, pit, kick" .
 Some accents of English use a glottal stop in place of a  when it comes before an alveolar nasal in the same word (as opposed to in the next word), such as in the word "beaten" .
 Nasals become syllabic, or their own syllable, only when immediately following an obstruent (as opposed to just any consonant), such as in the words "leaden, chasm" . Take in comparison "kiln, film"; in most accents of English, the nasals are not syllabic.
 The lateral , however, is syllabic at the end of the word when immediately following any consonant, like in "paddle, whistle" .
 When considering  as liquids,  is included in this rule as well as present in the words "sabre, razor, hammer, tailor" .
 Alveolar stops become voiced taps when they occur between two vowels, as long as the second vowel is unstressed. Take for instance mainly American English pronunciations like "fatty, data, daddy, many" .
In this case, both alveolar stops and alveolar nasal plus stop sequences become voiced taps after two vowels when the second vowel is unstressed. This can vary among speakers, where the rule does not apply to certain words or when speaking at a slower pace.
 All alveolar consonants assimilate to dentals when occurring before a dental. Take the words "eighth, tenth, wealth". This also applies across word boundaries, for example "at this" .
 Alveolar stops are reduced or omitted when between two consonants.
 A consonant is shortened when it is before an identical consonant, such as in "big game" or "top post".
 A homorganic voiceless stop may be inserted after a nasal before a voiceless fricative followed by an unstressed vowel in the same word. For example, a bilabial voiceless plosive  can be detected in the word "something"  even though it is orthographically not indicated. This is known as epenthesis. However, the following vowel must be unstressed.
 Velar stops  become more front when the following vowel sound in the same syllable becomes more front. Compare for instance "cap"  vs. "key"  and "gap"  vs. "geese" .
 The lateral  is velarized at the end of a word when it comes after a vowel as well as before a consonant. Compare for example "life"  vs. "file"  or "feeling"  vs. "feel" .

Other languages
There are many examples for allophones in languages other than English. Typically, languages with a small phoneme inventory allow for quite a lot of allophonic variation: examples are Hawaiian and Pirahã. Here are some examples (the links of language names go to the specific article or subsection on the phenomenon):
 Consonant allophones
Final devoicing, particularly final-obstruent devoicing: Arapaho, English, Nahuatl, Catalan and many others
 Voicing of initial consonant 
 Anticipatory assimilation
 Aspiration changes: Algonquin 
 Frication between vowels: Dahalo
 Lenition: Manx, Corsican 
 Voicing of clicks: Dahalo

 Allophones for : Arapaho, Xavante
 Allophones for : Xavante
 Allophones for : Bengali
 Allophones for : Xavante
 Allophones for : Manam
 Allophones for : Garhwali
Southwestern and Lower Yangtze)
 Allophones for 
 : Finnish, Spanish and many more.
 wide range of variation in Japanese (as archiphoneme /N/)
 Allophones for : Xavante
 Allophones for : Bengali
 Allophones for : Bengali, Taos
 Allophones for :
  and : Hindustani, Hawaiian
 fricative  before unrounded vowels: O'odham
 Allophones for : Bengali
 Vowel allophones
 Polish
 Russian
 Vowel/consonant allophones
 Vowels become glides in diphthongs: Manam

Representing a phoneme with an allophone 
Since phonemes are abstractions of speech sounds, not the sounds themselves, they have no direct phonetic transcription. When they are realized without much allophonic variation, a simple broad transcription is used. However, when there are complementary allophones of a phoneme, the allophony becomes significant and things then become more complicated. Often, if only one of the allophones is simple to transcribe, in the sense of not requiring diacritics, that representation is chosen for the phoneme.

However, there may be several such allophones, or the linguist may prefer greater precision than that allows. In such cases, a common convention is to use the "elsewhere condition" to decide the allophone that stands for the phoneme. The "elsewhere" allophone is the one that remains once the conditions for the others are described by phonological rules.

For example, English has both oral and nasal allophones of its vowels. The pattern is that vowels are nasal only before a nasal consonant in the same syllable; elsewhere, they are oral. Therefore, by the "elsewhere" convention, the oral allophones are considered basic, and nasal vowels in English are considered to be allophones of oral phonemes.

In other cases, an allophone may be chosen to represent its phoneme because it is more common in the languages of the world than the other allophones, because it reflects the historical origin of the phoneme, or because it gives a more balanced look to a chart of the phonemic inventory.

An alternative, which is commonly used for archiphonemes, is to use a capital letter, such as /N/ for [m], [n], [ŋ].

In rare cases, a linguist may represent phonemes with abstract symbols, such as dingbats, to avoid privileging any particular allophone.

See also
Allo-
Allophonic rule
Allomorph
Alternation (linguistics)
Diaphoneme
List of phonetics topics

References

External links 
 Phonemes and allophones

Phonetics
Phonology